Heterolocha hypoleuca is a moth in the family Geometridae first described by George Hampson in 1907. It is found in India.

References

Ourapterygini